4x4 (literally, "Nordic quadrille") is a 1965 Nordic co-production drama film directed by Palle Kjærulff-Schmidt, Klaus Rifbjerg, Rolf Clemens, Maunu Kurkvaara and Jan Troell. It was entered into the 4th Moscow International Film Festival, winning a Special Diploma.

Cast
 Niels Barfoed (segment "Sommerkrig")
 Christoffer Bro (segment "Sommerkrig")
 Robert Broberg as Frank Citter (Pike med hvit ball)
 Allan Edwall as Banvakten (segment "Uppehåll i myrlandet")
 Karl Erik Flens as Station master (segment "Uppehåll i myrlandet")
 Vegard Hall as an old musician (Pike med hvit ball)
 Yvonne Ingdal
 Anne Marit Jacobsen as Jenta (Pike med hvit ball)
 Ole Sørlie as Gutten (Pike med hvit ball)
 Max von Sydow as Kvist (segment "Uppehåll i myrlandet")
 Kari Øhrn Geelmuyden as Vibeke (Pike med hvit ball)
 May-Britt Stierncreutz (segment "Pourquoi?")
 Jaakko Ahvonen (segment "Pourquoi?")
 Sinikka Hannula (segment "Pourquoi?")

References

External links
 
 

1965 films
1965 drama films
1960s Danish-language films
1960s Finnish-language films
1960s Norwegian-language films
1960s Swedish-language films
Danish black-and-white films
Finnish black-and-white films
Norwegian black-and-white films
Swedish black-and-white films
Films directed by Jan Troell
Swedish multilingual films
Norwegian multilingual films
Finnish multilingual films
Danish multilingual films
Films scored by Erik Nordgren
Norwegian drama films
Swedish drama films
Danish drama films
Finnish drama films
1960s multilingual films
1960s Swedish films